Defending champion Venus Williams defeated Justine Henin in the final, 6–1, 3–6, 6–0 to win the ladies' singles tennis title at the 2001 Wimbledon Championships. It was her second Wimbledon singles title and third major singles title overall.

This tournament saw world No. 1 Martina Hingis lose in the opening round to world No. 83 Virginia Ruano Pascual.

Seeds

  Martina Hingis (first round)
  Venus Williams (champion)
  Lindsay Davenport (semifinals)
  Jennifer Capriati (semifinals)
  Serena Williams (quarterfinals)
  Amélie Mauresmo (third round)
  Kim Clijsters (quarterfinals)
  Justine Henin (final)
  Nathalie Tauziat (quarterfinals)
  Elena Dementieva (third round)
  Amanda Coetzer (third round)
  Magdalena Maleeva (fourth round)
  Arantxa Sánchez Vicario (second round)
  Jelena Dokić (fourth round)
  Sandrine Testud (fourth round)
  Silvia Farina Elia (third round)

  Meghann Shaughnessy (fourth round)
  Anke Huber (fourth round)
  Conchita Martínez (quarterfinals)
  Amy Frazier (third round)
  Barbara Schett (third round)
  Paola Suárez (first round)
  Magüi Serna (first round)
  Henrieta Nagyová (first round)
  Chanda Rubin (first round)
  Anne Kremer (first round)
  Ángeles Montolio (third round)
  Lisa Raymond (third round)
  Elena Likhovtseva (third round)
  Patty Schnyder (third round)
  Tamarine Tanasugarn (fourth round)
  Tatiana Panova (third round)

Qualifying

Draw

Finals

Top half

Section 1

Section 2

Section 3

Section 4

Bottom half

Section 5

Section 6

Section 7

Section 8

References

External links

2001 Wimbledon Championships on WTAtennis.com
2001 Wimbledon Championships – Women's draws and results at the International Tennis Federation

Women's Singles
Wimbledon Championship by year – Women's singles
Wimbledon Championships
Wimbledon Championships